The 4th Asian Table Tennis Championships 1978 were held in Kuala Lumpur, Malaysia, from 22 November to 2 December 1978. It was organised by the Table Tennis Association of Malaysia under the authority of Asian Table Tennis Union (ATTU) and International Table Tennis Federation (ITTF).

Medal summary

Medal table

Events

See also
World Table Tennis Championships
Asian Cup

References

Asian Table Tennis Championships
Asian Table Tennis Championships
Table Tennis Championships
Table tennis competitions in Malaysia
Asian Table Tennis Championships
Asian Table Tennis Championships
Asian Table Tennis Championships